Johnson Suleman (born Johnson Sule; 24 March 1971) is a Nigerian televangelist and the senior pastor and general overseer of Omega Fire Ministries International, a church with its headquarters in Auchi, Edo State. After working as an assistant pastor in the Armor of God Church in Lagos from 1998, he started Omega Fire Ministries in 2004.

He identifies fellow Nigerian pastor Enoch Adeboye as his ‘spiritual father’.

Early life 
Suleman was born Johnson Sule on the 24th March 1971, to Mrs Esther Sule and Hon. Imoudu Sule.

Suleman, who then had an “insatiable thirst for God”, claimed the revelation made him understand he had to spread the gospel around the world through a ministry. He also has a biological younger brother named Dr Sule Emmanuel, who was formerly a pastor in the South African branch of Suleman’s Omega Fire Ministries International. 

Suleman had his primary and secondary education in Auchi. And according to the fiery preacher he became a millionaire at the age of 19 while he was still schooling, having then had a job of moving cocoa in trucks from his state to the northern states of Nigeria. 

Suleman claims to have grown up under the tutelage of the late Benson Idahosa prior to the formation of Omega Fire Ministries International, but he does have an informal father–son relationship with Ayo Oritsejafor having previously submitted under his ministry.

References 

Place of birth missing (living people)
Nigerian Christian clergy
Nigerian television evangelists
Living people
1971 births